In the Nightside Eclipse is the first studio album and fourth official release by Norwegian black metal band Emperor, released in 1994 through Candlelight Records. It was their only album to feature drummer Faust and one-time bassist Tchort. Considered a landmark in the black metal scene, the album has been ranked by critics as one of the most influential albums of the genre. It also contains some of Emperor's best known tracks, "I Am the Black Wizards" and "Inno a Satana".

Artwork
The album cover was drawn by Kristian Wåhlin, also known as "Necrolord", depicting a host of orcs en route to Minas Morgul. The part below the band logo is based upon a section of a larger engraving called "Death on a Pale Horse (Revelation)" by Gustave Doré. That section itself was also used as the album cover for the Emperor (EP).

Musical style, writing, composition 
In the Nightside Eclipse has often been referred to as a pioneering influence in symphonic black metal. Although all the key elements of black metal are present, such as fast tremolo-picked guitar passages, harsh screams, and raw, lo-fi production, the use of symphonic keyboard sections is a key part of the album's distinctive sound. According to Steve Huey of AllMusic, "Even if the keyboards mostly just outline basic chord changes, they add a melancholy air to all the furious extreme sounds, turning the one-note ugliness of black metal into something emotionally complex."

Most of the music was written and rehearsed before the band entered the studio, however much of the symphonic keyboard sections were composed in the studio at the time of recording as the band did not then have a permanent keyboard player. Some of the lyrics on the final version of the album were partially written by Mortiis before he left the band. Samoth has suggested that the frequent use of the word "emperor" in the lyrics became a kind of metaphor, "for our own entity, for the dark lord, for the devil, for the strong and mighty." Samoth has cited the power of Norwegian nature as a key inspiration on Emperor's music and this album in particular. They also expressed a fascination with the Viking age, Tolkien's literature, the story of Dracula, as well as "everything related to Transylvania, the Carpathian Mountains, the dark corners of Eastern Europe, and folklore." Ihsahn, however, has explained that he never read much of Tolkien's work, although he consciously made use of the language and imagery of fantasy.

Recording, production 
The album was co-produced by Pytten, who produced Mayhem's De Mysteriis Dom Sathanas and Burzum's debut album, as well as albums by Immortal and Enslaved. Faust partially credits Pytten with the sound of In the Nightside Eclipse.  Although the album was recorded in July 1993, it was not mixed until the following year due to Faust and Samoth's arrests and sentences in jail. In the end, only Ihsahn and Samoth were present for the mixing of the album, though he passed along his input to them in a letter. Ihsahn was ill at the time of recording, and Tchort recalls him spitting blood while recording vocals for the album. Some of the early vocal takes were replaced with ones recorded after he had recovered, as were some of the keyboard parts.

Critical reception and legacy 

In his review, Steve Huey of AllMusic gave the album five stars out of five, writing, "In the Nightside Eclipse resoundingly demonstrated that there was real musical substance and ambition in the world of black metal. [...] [it] somehow managed to capture the essence of the genre while completely rewriting its rule book", commenting that it was also "the first [album] to fuse black metal with progressive and symphonic elements, setting the stage for a bevy of future experimentation in the genre, [...] As such, it certainly possesses the farthest-reaching legacy of anything from Norway's bloody first wave, and ranks as one of the most important heavy metal albums of the '90s." In 2005, the album was ranked number 292 in Rock Hard magazine's book The 500 Greatest Rock & Metal Albums of All Time. Kyle Ward of Sputnikmusic gave the album 5/5, writing that "In the Nightside Eclipse is a masterwork because of this compositional balance. It allows the keys to be overbearing without stealing the show – an attribute that the lack of which has since proven to be the downfall of countless symphonic black metal acts. This is still, at its core, a harsh, obscenely heavy record, and one only needs to place themselves in the maelstrom of tracks like "I Am the Black Wizards" to realize there is more than just symphonies at work here."

The album is widely considered one of the most important releases in black metal, particularly for the second wave of black metal, and has been frequently described as a classic by music critics. The album has gone on to influence countless bands, with many considering it the first true symphonic black metal album. Kyle Ward of SputnikMusic credits Emperor with "[taking] the genre in a direction now seen as a natural extension of black metal's sphere of influence." It is the only Emperor album to feature Tchort on bass, who later went on to play with Carpathian Forest, Blood Red Throne, and others. In 2005 Decibel Magazine adopted the album into their hall of fame, writing that "upon its release in 1995, In the Nightside Eclipse established Emperor as the reigning masters of a more complex, atmospheric style of "symphonic black metal". They also called it "one of the most historically fascinating and sonically influential albums in the annals of extreme metal." In 2009, Loudwire named it the 18th best debut album of all time. In 2009, IGN included In the Nightside Eclipse in their "10 Great Black Metal Albums" list; according to IGN, "Emperor inspired the wave of overtly-technical black-metal bands that would rule the underground in the early 2000s. Dimmu Borgir and Cradle of Filth owe a huge debt to this album." In July 2014, In the Nightside Eclipse was listed at number three in Guitar World magazine's list of "Superunknown: 50 Iconic Albums That Defined 1994". In 2021, it was elected by Metal Hammer as the best symphonic metal album of all time.

Matt Heafy of Trivium wrote that "Emperor had crafted a unique sound in its combination of the classical with modern metal conventions that had not been executed with such precision before."

Reissues
In 1999, the album was remastered and reissued, with two cover songs as bonus tracks: "A Fine Day to Die" by Bathory, and "Gypsy" by Mercyful Fate. For the reissue, the opening tracks "Intro" and "Into the Infinity of Thoughts" were combined, whilst the album was packaged in a paper slipcase covering the traditional jewel case, with both featuring the same artwork. A second reissue followed in 2004, which included videos of live performances from 1997. In 2014, in celebration of the album's 20th anniversary, the band reissued a remastered deluxe version of the album. It also featured the bonus tracks from the 'As the Shadows Rise' 1994 EP, as well as a previously unreleased alternative mix of the album and pre-production rehearsal tracks from 1993. The album was remastered by Jens Bogren at Fascination Street Studios in 2014.

Track listing

Personnel

Emperor
Emperor – mastering
Ihsahn – vocals, lead guitar; keyboards
Samoth – rhythm guitar
Tchort – bass guitar
Faust – drums

Additional personnel
Alver – bass (tracks 9, 10 on 1999 edition)
Trym – drums (tracks 9, 10 on 1999 edition)
Charmand Grimloch – keyboard (track 10 on 1999 edition)
Tim Turan – mastering
Christophe Szpajdel – logo

References

Emperor (band) albums
1994 debut albums
Candlelight Records albums
Albums with cover art by Kristian Wåhlin